Indian Air Force Academy, Dundigal  is a Defence Service training institute located in Medchal-Malkajgiri district  from Hyderabad, in the Indian state of Telangana.

The academy was set up to train cadets from Indian Airforce Service cadre officers. It imparts training to the flying, technical and ground duty branches as well as officers of the Indian Navy & the Indian Coast Guard. This is a home for the officer trainees who learn their specialisation and are nurtured to become capable leaders. After one year's training, officer cadets are commissioned into various branches of the Indian Air Force (IAF). It inducted women cadets into the IAF for the first time in June 1993.

History
The foundation stone of the Air Force Academy was laid by the then President of India Dr. Zakir Hussain on 11 October 1967. The academy was established in 1969 and started operations in 1971. Air Commodore J. D. Aquino was the first Commandant of the academy.

Commandant

The Commandant is the head and in-charge of all the functioning of the Air Force Academy. The Commandant of the Academy is a Three-star rank officer holding the rank of Air Marshal.

Training

In this academy, IAF pilots are trained to learn flying through successive stages. Those who pass out as fighter pilots serve in front-line combat squadrons equipped with Rafale, Su-30MKI, MiG-29, MiG-21, Mirage 2000, Tejas aircraft. For those interested in flying transport aircraft, the IAF offers heavy multi engined Il-76 aircraft, C-17 Globemaster III  and the twin engined multi role An-32 transport aircraft, besides HS 748 and the Dornier 228 light utility transport aircraft.

By joining the helicopter fleet, the trainees learn to fly at treetop height and landing in remote areas. The curriculum also includes flying helicopter gunships like Indian developed Dhruv, Attack helicopter like AH-64 Apache, Mi-26, heavy-lift choppers, casualty evacuation, para dropping of troops and air lifting of supplies.

The academy imparts specialist training to young men and women who shoulder responsibility as leaders in other areas of air force operations. These are administrative, air controlling, meteorological, logistics, accounts and education branches. Swimming, field and indoor games are included in the evening routine.

Officers from friendly foreign countries are also occasionally trained at the Air Force Academy.

The following are the types of training conducted at the academy:
 Flying training
If a cadet has joined the Flying Branch, training is divided into Stage I, II and III. Each stage takes the trainee pilots from fundamental to more complex levels of aviation. It is after Stage I that the cadets are sent for specialisation on fighter, helicopter or transport aircraft.
 Air Traffic Control Officers' training
The training at the Air Force Academy for Air Traffic Control is designed on the basis of the International Civil Aviation Organisation (ICAO) procedures, altered to suit the military aviation requirements.
 Ground Duty Officers' training
Ground Duty Officers' training is for all non-technical branches of the Indian Air Force. If the cadet has joined the Administrative, Logistics, Accounts, Education or Meteorology division, they will be trained at the Air Force Academy before joining the Air Force as Ground Duty Officer.
 Joint Services training
Cadets of the Flying, Air Traffic Control and the Ground Duty Branches are imparted Joint Services Training here for 22 weeks. The cadets selected for entry into the Aeronautical Engineering Branches are sent to the Air Force Technical College at Jalahalli, Bangalore. Training includes common service subjects like administration and service knowledge.

See also
 Indian Military Academy, Dehradun
 Indian Naval Academy, Ezhimala
 Kendriya Vidyalaya No. 1 AFA, Dundigal
 Kendriya Vidyalaya No. 2 AFA, Dundigal

References

External links

 Dundigul Air Force Academy at Global Security

Indian Air Force
Air force academies
Military academies of India
Universities and colleges in Hyderabad, India
Airports in Telangana
1969 establishments in Andhra Pradesh